Yadgar (Persian: یادگار; DMG: Yādgār; English: "Monument") was a Persian-language journal published from 1944 to 1949 in a total of 50 issues in Teheran. Its editor was Abbas Iqbal (1896–1955), a Persian historian and nationalist. The Yadgar journal specialised in literary and especially historical researches on Iran.

References

Defunct literary magazines
Defunct magazines published in Iran
History magazines
Magazines established in 1944
Magazines disestablished in 1949
Magazines published in Tehran
Persian-language magazines
Literary magazines published in Iran
1944 establishments in Iran
1949 disestablishments in Iran